Ophiusa discriminans is a moth of the family Erebidae first described by Francis Walker in 1858. It is found in Brunei, New Caledonia, New Guinea, Sri Lanka, Thailand and in Australia in the Northern Territory and Queensland.

The larvae feed on Melaleuca species.

Subspecies
Ophiusa discriminans discriminans
Ophiusa discriminans sublutea (New Guinea)

Gallery

References

Ophiusa
Moths described in 1858